"Covered" is a song performed by Planetshakers and Israel & New Breed. Planetshakers released the song as the lead single from live album This Is Our Time: Live (2014) on October 21, 2014, as well as the Israel & New Breed live album Covered: Alive in Asia (2015) on July 24, 2015.  The song also appeared on the album on the Planetshakers Outback Worship Sessions (2015) and also appeared on the Spanish album Eres Mi Todo as the song Me Cubres by Job González. The song was written by Joth Hunt and Israel Houghton.

Composition and genre

The song was written by Joth Hunt and Israel Houghton.

In 2014, Planetshakers released the song Covered, the song was recorded live during the Awakening 2014 conference held April 14–17, 2014 in Melbourne, Australia.

In 2014, Israel & New Breed released the song Covered, the song was recorded in studio with style Gospel for (Radio Edit) also recorded the live version that appears on the album with the same title Covered released in 2015.

In 2015, Planetshakers released the song Covered, this song was recorded in studio with style Pop Acoustic for the album Outback Worship Sessions.

Commercial performance
Covered on the Digital Song Sales chart on October 31, 2014, the song debuted at No. 3.

Music videos
On October 23, 2014, Planetshakers released the live music video of "Covered" on YouTube channel and has garnered over 2 million views as of June 2021. Planetshakers also released a music video of Covered in an acoustic session on October 23, 2014.

Covers and renditions
Covered has been translated and interpreted in many evangelical churches around the world. This song has been covered by a number of Christian music artists.

Israel Houghton featuring Job González recorded the song "Me Cubres" (Covered) in Spanish for the album Eres Mi Todo released on February 15, 2016.

Cindy Cruse-Ratcliff also released the song (Covered) on October 26, 2016.

Charts

References

2014 singles
2014 songs
Christian songs
Gospel songs
Contemporary Christian songs
Songs written by Joth Hunt
Planetshakers songs
Planetshakers Ministries International singles